Meet the Magoons is a six-part comedy television series in the United Kingdom aired on Channel 4 in 2005, directed by and starring Hardeep Singh Kohli. The main characters are a Punjabi family who live in Glasgow, and own an Indian restaurant called "The Spice".

It received mixed reviews. A. A. Gill hoped it "might well evolve into something classic" and Nancy Banks-Smith of The Guardian called it "modern to the point of surreal". A second series was not commissioned.

Cast
Hardeep Singh Kohli - Hamish
Nitin Ganatra - Nitin
Paul Sharma - Paul
Sanjeev Kohli - Surjit
Vincent Ebrahim - Nitin's dad

References

External links

TV review The Stage

2000s British sitcoms
2005 British television series debuts
2005 British television series endings
Channel 4 sitcoms
Television shows set in Glasgow